Jagson Airlines was an air charter company based in Delhi, India. It operates charter services in India.

History 
The company started charter operations in November 1991 with two 18-seat Dornier 228-201 aircraft.
Jagsons Airlines Limited was incorporated in January 1994 to operate air-taxi services under the open sky policy of the Government. The company was promoted by J.P. Gupta, Pradeep Kumar Gupta and their associates. The company was to acquire four aircraft but commenced started operations with one Dornier 228.

In 2006, they announced plans to expand their services to 9 cities, using leased Airbus A321-200 aircraft. The airline received its regional airline licence from the DGCA in early 2009 but the regional services never took off within the stipulated 18 months, causing its regional airline license to lapse. However Jagson continued to possess its non-scheduled operator license. At the end of its operation, the company provided only charter services from Delhi and Mumbai, and did not operate scheduled flights. The company ended operation in 2010.

Fleet 

As of 2014.

References

External links 
Photographs
Jagson Airlines Office Addresses

Defunct airlines of India
Airlines established in 1991
Airlines disestablished in 1991
Companies based in New Delhi
Indian companies disestablished in 1991
Indian companies established in 1991
1981 establishments in Delhi